An exeligmos ( — turning of the wheel) is a period of 54 years, 33 days that can be used to predict successive eclipses with similar properties and location. For a solar eclipse, after every exeligmos a solar eclipse of similar characteristics will occur in a location close to the eclipse before it. For a lunar eclipse the same part of the earth will view an eclipse that is very similar to the one that occurred one exeligmos before it (see main text for visual examples). The exeligmos is an eclipse cycle that is a triple saros, three saroses (or saroi) long, with the advantage that it has nearly an integer number of days so the next eclipse will be visible at locations and times near the eclipse that occurred one exeligmos earlier. In contrast, each saros, an eclipse occurs about eight hours later in the day or about 120° to the west of the eclipse that occurred one saros earlier.

It corresponds to:
669 synodic months
725.996 draconic months
56.996 eclipse years (114 eclipse seasons)
716.976 anomalistic months

The 57 eclipse years means that if there is a solar eclipse (or lunar eclipse), then after one exeligmos a New Moon (resp. Full Moon) will take place at the same node of the orbit of the Moon, and under these circumstances another eclipse can occur.

Details 
The Greeks had knowledge of the exeligmos by at latest 100 BC. A Greek astronomical clock called the Antikythera mechanism used epicyclic gearing to predict the dates of consecutive exeligmoses.

The exeligmos is 669 synodic months (every eclipse cycle must be an integer number of synodic months), almost exactly 726 draconic months (which ensures the sun and moon are in alignment during the new moon), and also almost exactly 717 anomalistic months (ensuring the moon is at the same point of its elliptic orbit). It also corresponds to 114 eclipse seasons. The first two factors make this a long-lasting eclipse series. The latter factor is what makes all the eclipses in an exeligmos so similar. The near-integer number of anomalistic months ensures that the apparent diameter of the moon will be nearly the same with each successive eclipse. The fact that it is very nearly a whole integer of days ensures each successive eclipse in the series occurs very close to the previous eclipse in the series.
For each successive eclipse in an exeligmos series the longitude and latitude can change significantly because an exeligmos is over a month longer than a calendar year, and the gamma increases/decreases because an exeligmos is about three hours shorter than a draconic month. The sun's apparent diameter also changes significantly in one month, affecting the length and width of a solar eclipse.

Solar exeligmos example 
Here is a comparison of two annular solar eclipses one exeligmos apart:

Lunar exeligmos example 
Here is a comparison of two total lunar eclipses one exeligmos apart:

Sample series of solar exeligmos 
Exeligmos table of solar saros 136. Each eclipse occurs at roughly the same longitude but moves about 5-15 degrees in latitude with each successive cycle.

Solar Exeligmos Animation 

Here is an animation of an exeligmos series. Note the similar paths of each total eclipse, and how they fall close to the same longitude of the earth.

Solar Saros Animation (for comparison) 
This next animation is from the entire saros series of the exeligmos above. Notice how each eclipse falls on a different side of the earth (120 degrees apart).

See also
 Eclipse cycle
 Saros
 Full moon cycle

References 

Eclipses
Time in astronomy
Ancient Greek astronomy